The 2014 New South Wales Waratahs season was the club's 18th season since the inception of Super Rugby in 1996.

Players

Squad
The squad for the 2014 Super Rugby season

(c) Denotes team captain, Bold denotes player is internationally capped.

Transfers

Ins:

Outs:

Quick Summary

Standings

Player statistics 

 Source: 2014 Waratahs Team Statistics

Home crowd attendances 

*Does not include Round 17 v. Brumbies where crowd figure is unavailable

References

External links 
 Waratahs Official website
 Australia Super Rugby website
 SANZAR website

2014
2014 Super Rugby season by team
2014 in Australian rugby union